Bernard MacMahon or McMahon may refer to:

Bernard MacMahon (bishop) (1680–1747), Irish Roman Catholic prelate; Archbishop of Armagh
Bernard MacMahon (bible translator) (c. 1736–1816), Irish Catholic priest, who translated the Douay-Rheims New Testament and the complete Bible
Bernard McMahon (died 1816), Irish-American horticulturist, most famous for The American Gardener's Calendar
Bernard MacMahon (filmmaker), English newspaper writer and music video director
Bernard McMahon (murder victim), Irish victim of the McMahon killings

See also
MacMahon (surname)